Isla Mitlán, is an island in the Gulf of California, located within Bahía de los Ángeles east of the Baja California Peninsula. It is adjacent to the west coast of Isla Coronado.The island is uninhabited and is part of the Ensenada Municipality.

Biology

Isla Mitlán has two species of reptile, including Sauromalus hispidus (Spiny Chuckwalla) and Uta stansburiana (Common Side-blotched Lizard).

References

http://herpatlas.sdnhm.org/places/overview/isla-mitl%C3%A1n/89/1/

Islands of Baja California
Islands of the Gulf of California
Islands of Ensenada Municipality
Uninhabited islands of Mexico